Kazimierz Władysław Bryniarski (11 October 1934 – 27 April 2011), was a Polish ice hockey player and coach. He played for Podhale Nowy Targ during his career. He also played for the Polish national team at the 1956 Winter Olympics, and multiple world championships. After his playing career he turned to coaching, winning the 1968–69 Polish league championship with Podhale. In 2004 he was awarded the Golden Cross of Merit for his services to sports.

References

External links
 

1934 births
2011 deaths
Ice hockey players at the 1956 Winter Olympics
Legia Warsaw (ice hockey) players
Olympic ice hockey players of Poland
People from Nowy Targ
Podhale Nowy Targ players
Polish ice hockey coaches
Polish ice hockey forwards
Recipients of the Gold Cross of Merit (Poland)
Sportspeople from Lesser Poland Voivodeship